Ferenc Rott (born 6 October 1970 in Somberek) is a Hungarian football player who currently plays for BVSC Budapest.

References
 Futballévkönyv 1999 [Football Yearbook 1999], Volume I, pp. 78–82., Aréna 2000 kiadó, Budapest, 2000 

1970 births
Living people
Hungarian footballers
Veszprém LC footballers
Budapest Honvéd FC players
Szombathelyi Haladás footballers
Budapesti VSC footballers
Association football goalkeepers